In 2018, the  participated in the 2018 Super Rugby competition, the 23rd edition of the competition since its inception in 1996.

Personnel

Coaches and management

The Lions coaching and management staff for the 2018 Super Rugby season were:

Squad

The following players were named in the Lions squad for the 2018 Super Rugby season:

Standings

Round-by-round

The table below shows the Lions' progression throughout the season. For each round, their cumulative points total is shown with the overall log position:

Matches

The Lions played the following matches during the 2018 Super Rugby season:

Player statistics

The Super Rugby appearance record for players that represented the Lions in 2018 is as follows:

(c) denotes the team captain. For each match, the player's squad number is shown. Starting players are numbered 1 to 15, while the replacements are numbered 16 to 22. "App" refers to the number of appearances made by the player, "Try" to the number of tries scored by the player, "Kck" to the number of points scored via kicks (conversions, penalties or drop goals) and "Pts" refer to the total number of points scored by the player.

 Willie Engelbrecht, Jaco Kriel and Christiaan Meyer did not make any appearances.

See also

 Lions
 2018 Super Rugby season

References

2018
2018 Super Rugby season by team
2018 in South African rugby union